NORACON (NORth European and Austrian CONsortium) is a consortium member of the SJU PPP that is managing the Research & Development (R&D) phase of the Single European Sky ATM Research (SESAR) Programme .

Overview 
NORACON aims at participation in the SESAR project thus developing the future ATM systems according to the
ATM master plan.

Among the activities are:
 i4D operation - giving improved correlation between airborne FMS and ground predicted trajectories
 Remote and virtual tower - e.g. allowing TWR ATCO to work for multiple airports

Legal basis 
A consortium agreement defines how these close competitors will work together under the SESAR project.

Funding and Budget 
NORACON is taking part in the 700M€ industrial share of the SJU PPP.

Members 
The members of the NORACON Consortium are:
 Austro Control
 Avinor
 EANS
 Finavia
 IAA
 Isavia
 LFV
 Naviair
 Swedavia

External links 
 NORACON
 SESAR JU web site
 SESAR
 Description of the SESAR Work Packages
 EUROCONTROL

Air traffic control in Europe
Air traffic control organizations
International aviation organizations